Chongqing Poly Tower is a skyscraper in Chongqing, China.

Situated at the site of former Chongqing hotel, the building sits on 11831 metre square of land at the junction Linjiangmen and Minsheng Road in the central business district (Jiefangbei) of Chongqing. It consists of offices, hotel rooms, and retail.

It contains office and hotel space. The building was topped out on June 18, 2010 and completed in 2013. It is the third tallest building in Chongqing.

See also
 List of tallest buildings in Chongqing

References

2013 establishments in China
Buildings and structures completed in 2013
Skyscraper office buildings in Chongqing
Buildings and structures in Chongqing
Skyscraper hotels in Chongqing
Retail buildings in China
Skyscrapers in Chongqing